The Three Notch Railroad  runs from a connection with CSX Transportation at Georgiana to Andalusia, Alabama, . This short line railroad was created in 2001 and is currently a subsidiary of Genesee & Wyoming.

Primary commodities include chemicals, polypropylene, fertilizer, and agricultural products, amounting to 1,050 annual carloads.

In April 2011, the Three Notch was named as one of the three railroads to be purchased by RailAmerica from Gulf and Ohio Railways for $12.7 million. RailAmerica was acquired by Genesee & Wyoming in 2012.

History

It was operated by the Louisville & Nashville between 1901–1982 and Seaboard System from 1983 to 1986. The section between Geneva, Alabama and Graceville was abandoned January 16, 1984. The remaining line between Georgiana and Geneva was purchased by Gulf & Ohio Railways on July 28, 1986, and renamed to the Alabama and Florida Railroad. The purchase included the  Andalusia and Conecuh Railroad from Andalusia to Gantt, Alabama.

The railroad to include  of trackage was purchased by Pioneer Railcorp on November 23, 1992.   of trackage from Georgiana to Andalusia, Alabama was sold back to Gulf & Ohio and named Three Notch railroad on June 11, 2001. This sale included the lease on the Andalusia & Conecuh Railroad. The Alabama and Florida Railway connected with Three Notch Railroad at Andalusia before abandonment of the remaining A&F in 2011.

References

External links
Three Notch Railroad official webpage - Genesee and Wyoming website
HawkinsRails.net - Three Notch Railway

Alabama railroads